Maiava Fuimaono Tito Asafo is a Samoan politician. He is a member of the FAST Party.

Maiva ran a bus company before entering politics. He first ran for the Legislative Assembly of Samoa in the 2021 Samoan by-elections as one of two candidates for the FAST Party for Falealili No. 2, and was elected with a lead of 150 votes.

References

Living people
Members of the Legislative Assembly of Samoa
Faʻatuatua i le Atua Samoa ua Tasi politicians
Year of birth missing (living people)